Events from the year 1420 in Ireland.

Incumbent
Lord: Henry V

Events
 Luttrellstown Castle was completed.

Births
November 24 – James Butler, 5th Earl of Ormonde, Lord Lieutenant (d. 1461)

Deaths
 Giolla na Naomh O hUidhrin, Irish historian and poet
 Thomas FitzGerald, 5th Earl of Desmond

 
1420s in Ireland
Ireland
Years of the 15th century in Ireland